Asparaginyl-tRNA synthetase, cytoplasmic is an enzyme that in humans is encoded by the NARS gene.

Aminoacyl-tRNA synthetases are a class of enzymes that charge tRNAs with their cognate amino acids.  Asparaginyl-tRNA synthetase is localized to the cytoplasm and belongs to the class II family of tRNA synthetases.  The N-terminal domain represents the signature sequence for the eukaryotic asparaginyl-tRNA synthetases.

References

Further reading

Human proteins